Papilio erostratus, the Erostratus swallowtail, is a species of Neotropical swallowtail butterfly from the genus Papilio that is found in Guatemala, Costa Rica, Belize and Mexico.

Description

It is very similar to Papilio pharnaces but in the male the spots on the upper surface of the hindwing are yellowish white. In the female the spots are red also above, larger than in the female of P. pharnaces the marginal spots of both wings also somewhat larger than in the foregoing species. Tail long and narrow. Sympatric with  P. pharnaces in western Mexico.

Habitat
It is most common in hilly country at a height of about 1500 m (approximately 5,000 ft).

Subspecies
Papilio erostratus erostratus – (Guatemala, Costa Rica, Belize)
Papilio erostratus erostratinus Vázquez, 1947 – (Mexico)
Papilio erostratus vazquezae Beutelspacher, 1986 – (Mexico)

References

Lewis, H.L. (1974). Butterflies of the World  Page 24, figure 21.

erostratus
Butterflies described in 1847
Papilionidae of South America